Palmer Bus Service (and Palmer Charter Services) is a bus company serving Minnesota and Wisconsin, founded by Floyd Palmer in 1974 in St. Clair, Minnesota. It is the 36th largest privately run bus company in the nation. Palmer runs over 500 buses and vans.

Awards
It received a 2001 National School Transportation Association Golden Merit Award "In recognition of excellence of service, safety and outstanding demonstration of community responsibility." The award was one of six presented to school bus operators across the U.S. and Canada at the NSTA convention in Philadelphia, July 2001.

References

Bus transportation in Minnesota
Bus transportation in Wisconsin
Bus companies of the United States
Companies based in Minnesota
Blue Earth County, Minnesota
Transportation companies based in Minnesota